Penn Foster Career School is a U.S. for-profit, regionally and nationally-accredited distance education school offering career diploma programs and certificate programs. It was founded in 1890 as International Correspondence Schools, or ICS. Penn Foster is headquartered in Scranton, Pennsylvania.

History
In 1890, Thomas J. Foster, a newspaper editor, founded the school to provide coal miners with education needed to advance in their careers and improve worker safety. At the turn of the century, the school was officially known as the International Correspondence Schools (ICS), and one out of every 27 adults in the U.S. had taken an ICS course. In 1904, Foster expanded his school to the UK; this is now a separate distance education school called ICS Learn.

ICS parent company Intext was acquired by National Education in 1979. Harcourt General acquired National Education in 1997. Reed Elsevier acquired Harcourt in 2001 and divested its higher education unit to Thomson Corporation.

ICS was renamed Penn Foster in 2005. Wicks Group, a private equity firm, purchased the school from Thomson Corporation in 2007. In December 2009, Penn Foster Career School was purchased by test preparation and educational support company The Princeton Review, and in 2012 the Princeton Review brand name and operations were bought for $33 million by Charlesbank Capital Partners, a private-equity firm. The parent company was renamed Education Holdings 1, Inc. In 2013, Education Holdings 1 filed for bankruptcy; it exited two months later. In 2014 Vistria Group, led by Martin Nesbitt, acquired Penn Foster.

In December 2015, Penn Foster acquired a competency-based learning platform built by UniversityNow.

Bain Capital purchased Penn Foster in 2018.

See also
Penn Foster High School
Penn Foster College

References

External links
Official Site

American companies established in 1890
1890 establishments in Pennsylvania
Distance education institutions based in the United States
Distance Education Accreditation Commission